Harri Ilvonen (born 11 November 1988) is a Finnish former professional ice hockey defenseman who played in his country's top tier Liiga.

Playing career
Ilvonen made his first appearances for Tappara during the 2006–07 season. After a promising rookie year, he was selected by the Minnesota Wild in the sixth-round, 170th overall, in the 2007 NHL Entry Draft. In the spring of 2008 he had a brief stint with HPK before returning to Tappara for the next season.

Ilvonen was never signed by the Wild and remained in Finland for the entirety of his professional career, finishing with the Espoo Blues in the 2012–13 season. Having ended his career playing in 204 Liiga games, Ilvonen later returned to Tappara in a coaching capacity, accepting an assistant coaching role with their under-18 youth team from the 2015–16 season.

External links 

1988 births
Living people
Espoo Blues players
Finnish ice hockey defencemen
HPK players
JYP Jyväskylä players
Minnesota Wild draft picks
Tappara players
Ice hockey people from Helsinki
21st-century Finnish people